Olga Lucía de Angulo Irragorri (26 November 1955 – 8 February 2011) was a Colombian swimmer. She competed at the 1968 Summer Olympics and the 1972 Summer Olympics. She finished third in the 1971 Pan American Games 200 metres freestyle. De Angulo had lived in Vancouver, Canada since 1998.

References

External links
 

1955 births
2011 deaths
Colombian female swimmers
Olympic swimmers of Colombia
Swimmers at the 1968 Summer Olympics
Swimmers at the 1972 Summer Olympics
Swimmers at the 1971 Pan American Games
Pan American Games bronze medalists for Colombia
Sportspeople from Cali
Pan American Games medalists in swimming
Colombian emigrants to Canada
Central American and Caribbean Games gold medalists for Colombia
Central American and Caribbean Games medalists in swimming
Competitors at the 1970 Central American and Caribbean Games
Medalists at the 1971 Pan American Games
20th-century Colombian women
21st-century Colombian women